Dade County High School (DCHS) is a public high school in Trenton, Georgia, United States. It is part of the Dade County School District.

Notable alumni 
 Ashley Houts, WNBA player

References

External links 
 

Education in Dade County, Georgia
Public high schools in Georgia (U.S. state)